Paulo Ribenboim (born March 13, 1928) is a Brazilian-Canadian mathematician who specializes in number theory.

Biography 
Ribenboim was born into a Jewish family in Recife, Brazil. He received his BSc in mathematics from the University of São Paulo in 1948, and won a fellowship to study with Jean Dieudonné in France at the University of Nancy in the early 1950s, where he became a close friend of Alexander Grothendieck.
He has contributed to the theory of ideals and of valuations.

Ribenboim has authored 246 publications including 13 books. He has been at Queen's University in Kingston, Ontario, since the 1960s, where he remains a professor emeritus.

Jean Dieudonné was one of his doctoral advisors. Andrew Granville has been a doctoral student of Ribenboim.

The Ribenboim Prize of the Canadian Number Theory Association is named in his honor.

Personal life 
In 1951, Ribenboim married Huguette Demangelle, a French Catholic woman whom he met in France. The couple have two children and five grandchildren, and have lived in Canada since 1962.

Bibliography 
 Paulo Ribenboim (1964) Functions, Limits, and Continuity , John Wiley & Sons, Inc.

References

External links 
 
 The Canadian Number Theory Association Ribenboim Prize

1928 births
Living people
People from Recife
Brazilian Jews
Number theorists
Brazilian emigrants to Canada
Brazilian expatriates in France
Academic staff of Queen's University at Kingston
20th-century Brazilian mathematicians
21st-century Canadian mathematicians